Ampney may refer to:

Places
Ampney Brook, a river in Gloucestershire, England
Ampney Crucis, a village and civil parish in the Cotswolds, part of the Cotswold District of Gloucestershire, England
Ampney St Mary, a village and civil parish in the Cotswolds, part of the Cotswold of Gloucestershire, England
Ampney St Peter, a village and civil parish in the Cotswolds, part of the Cotswold of Gloucestershire, England
Down Ampney, a village in the Cotswold district of Gloucestershire, England
RAF Down Ampney, a Royal Air Force station near Cricklade, Wiltshire and RAF Fairford, Gloucestershire

People
 Anthony Hungerford of Down Ampney, a Member of Parliament for Gloucestershire